À la Mort Subite is a typical Brussels café, located at Rue Montagne-aux-Herbes Potagères 7, which was originally run by Théophile Vossen, the inventor of Mort Subite beer. It is known for its authentic early-20th-century decor. The café is still run by the Vossen family but the beer is now produced by the Mort Subite brewery, a subsidiary of Alken-Maes, itself a subsidiary of Heineken. The café has been designated as a heritage site since September 17, 1998.

Tom Hooper's movie The Danish Girl, with Matthias Schoenaerts, was partly filmed there.

History 
The name Mort Subite comes from a dice game or a card game: the pitjesbak (ancestor of the 421 game) played in a Brussels bistro named "La Cour Royale" which stood at the corner of Rue de la Montagne and Rue d'Assaut. "La Cour Royale" was already there in the 1840s. At this time owned by a certain Mr Gérard, it was home of the Société des Droits et Devoirs de l'Ouvrier from 1848 to 1849. This club was involved in the Prado Conspiracy in Molenbeek. This society quickly left the premises to meet at "L'Ancienne Cour de Bruxelles" in the Fontainas neighbourhood. At the beginning of the 20th century, "La Cour Royale" was taken over by Théophile Vossen. The establishment was renamed "La Mort Subite". Expropriated due to the work at the junction, in 1927 the café moved to Rue Montagne aux Herbes Potagères, officially taking the name "À la Mort Subite" in 1928. Théophile Vossen then gave the name "Mort Subite" to the beer (gueuze, faro, kriek) he was producing. The Mort Subite brewery was located on the Rue des Capucins (near the Rue Haute) in Brussels. The brewery De Keersmaeker took over the Mort Subite production  in the 1960s. The beer is exported to many countries thanks to the fact that the De Keersmaeker brewery was taken over by an important malting group, Alken-Maes. The date, 1684, displayed on the bottles refers to the founding of the De Keersmaeker brewery, with its first brewer Joris Van Der Hasselt, even though the farmhouse of that name had existed since 1604. The brewery was renamed "Mort Subite", but the original date was retained on the label.

René and Jean-Pierre Vossen later took over the café, which is currently held by the fourth generation of Vossens.

In 2001, the first floor was refurbished and opened to customers.

Interior decoration 
The building, originally the premises of a manufacturer of art bronzes, was transformed into a café in 1910 by Paul Hamesse. It has kept its typical Brussels decor. The main room is in Louis XVI style. The garland pilasters and mirrors are listed.

References

External links 
 Official website

Buildings and structures in Brussels
Food and drink companies based in Brussels
Drinking establishments in Europe
Food and drink companies of Belgium